Abbas Bouazar (born 8 July 1992) is an Iranian professional Footballer who currently plays as a midfielder for Iranian football club Naft Masjed Soleyman in the Persian Gulf Pro League.

Club career

Goal In Esteghlal Ahvaz
Bouazar started his senior career with Esteghlal Ahvaz in 2012. He scored his first goal on 9 December 2012 in a 2–1 victory against Tarbiat Yazd. He scored three times in 38 appearances before leaving the club.

Naft Tehran
In December 2014 Bouazar signed with league leaders Naft Tehran. He scored his first goal in his first appearance with the club on 4 February 2015.

Trend on Social Media
In spring of 2021, in the semifinals of Iran's main cup competition, the Hazfi Cup, two competing teams (Saipa FC and Naft Tehran F.C.) had a very physical match, resulting in many red-cards being handed out to players. During the post-match interview, Iranian football legend, Ali Daei, who at the time was the manager of  Naft, criticised refereeing decisions, particularly the red card given to Bouazar. The reason for this was that during the interview, a reporter had asked him about his opinion on the red card given to an alleged player called "Mohammadi", who did not exist. The player who was actually red-carded was Bouazar, and Daei was shocked about the referee not even getting the name of the players correct. His response to the interview question was a letter by letter comparison of the words Bouazar and Mohammadi, where he counted the number of letters that exist in Bouazar and not in Mohammadi. The emotional interview quickly became a meme and is frequently shared on social media.

References

1992 births
Living people
People from Ahvaz
Iranian footballers
Association football midfielders
Esteghlal Ahvaz players
Naft Tehran F.C. players
Fajr Sepasi players
Foolad FC players
Naft Masjed Soleyman F.C. players
Sportspeople from Khuzestan province